First-seeded Roy Emerson defeated Pierre Darmon 3–6, 6–1, 6–4, 6–4 in the final to win the men's singles tennis title at the 1963 French Championships.

Seeds
The seeded players are listed below. Roy Emerson is the champion; others show the round in which they were eliminated.

  Roy Emerson (champion)
  Manuel Santana (semifinals)
  Pierre Darmon (final)
  Ken Fletcher (quarterfinals)
  Jan-Erik Lundqvist (second round)
  Bob Hewitt (fourth round)
  Ramanathan Krishnan (second round)
  Billy Knight (fourth round)
  Nicola Pietrangeli (quarterfinals)
  Martin Mulligan (third round)
  Tony Roche (first round)
  Fred Stolle (second round)
  Wilhelm Bungert (second round)
  Nikola Pilić (third round)
  István Gulyás (third round)
  Christian Kuhnke (fourth round)

Draw

Key
 Q = Qualifier
 WC = Wild card
 LL = Lucky loser
 r = Retired

Finals

Earlier rounds

Section 1

Section 2

Section 3

Section 4

Section 5

Section 6

Section 7

Section 8

External links
   on the French Open website

1963
1963 in French tennis